, 1,700 Pilatus PC-12s have been delivered. Most are used in the civil market.

Civilian

Airline operators

 Tashi Air

 Azul Brazilian Airlines

 Air Bravo Corp
 Nakina Air Service
 North Star Air
 Pascan Aviation
 Wasaya Airways
 Tantalus Air
 Harbour Air

 Aerocardal

 Jiangxi Express Airlines

 Alpha Aviation s.r.o. (5x PC-12)

Air Alsie

 Hendell Aviation

 Amref Health Africa

 JetFly

 Silver Flight

 Sounds Air

 Dexter Air Taxi

 Fly7

 Advanced Air
 Alaska Seaplanes
 Boutique Air
 PlaneSense
 Surf Air
 Tradewind Aviation
 Quest Diagnostics
 Aviation Charters, Inc

 Coastal Aviation

Other notable civil operators

 Royal Flying Doctor Service - operates 31 PC-12s for EMS/medical transport duties.

 Comair Flight Services (Charter) - operates 11 PC-12s
 South African Red Cross Air Mercy Service (Medevac) - operates 5 PC-12s 
 Fireblade Aviation (Charter) - operates 2 PC-12s
 Execujet (Charter) - operates 8 PC-12s
 Absolute Aviation (Charter) - operates 1 PC-12 (1 known PC-12)

 PlaneSense (Fractional/Charter) - operates 35 PC-12s

Government

 Argentine National Gendarmerie - operates two PC-12s

 Western Australia Police - operates two PC-12s for staff transport, search and rescue and disaster relief.
 Northern Territory Police

 Ontario Provincial Police - PC-12/45 with a camera mounted under the fuselage
 Ornge - operates 10 PC-12 NG for aeromedical transport
 Nishnawbe-Aski Police Service
 Royal Canadian Mounted Police

 1 PC-12 NG Federal Office of Civil Aviation

 Customs & Border Protection - Office of Air & Marine (U.S. Department of Homeland Security)
 Phoenix Police Department (Arizona) - PC-12 Spectre
 State Of Wisconsin - PC-12/45
 Colorado Department of Public Safety Division of Fire Prevention and Control - 2 PC-12 Spectre for wildland fire and SAR missions.

Military

 Bulgarian Air Force - operates one PC-12 for VIP and cargo transport.

 Chadian Air Force - operated one aircraft modified with a FLIR turret, damaged in the July 2017 N'Djamena storm.

 Finnish Air Force - operates six PC-12NG aircraft as liaison aircraft.

 Irish Air Corps - currently operates four aircraft, one PC-12NG aircraft in a utility transport role, and three PC-12M SPECTRE aircraft were delivered in September 2020 for reconnaissance and transport purposes.

 South African Air Force - operates one PC-12 with 41 Squadron for VIP transport.

 Swiss Air Force - operates one PC-12 for research flights and VIP transport.

 United States Air Force - operates 35 PC-12 (designated U-28A), for special operations (Air Force Special Operations Command).
 1st Special Operations Wing
 319th Special Operations Squadron
 27th Special Operations Group
 318th Special Operations Squadron
 492d Special Operations Wing
 6th Special Operations Squadron
 19th Special Operations Squadron
 919th Special Operations Wing
5th Special Operations Squadron
 United States Navy - operates 1 PC-12NG

Former operators

Civilian

Airline operators

 Bearskin Airlines
 NAC Air
 Peace Air

Military

 Afghan Air Force - operates 18 PC-12NG variants for special operations use. (Similar to USAF U-28A); 13 were delivered in March 2015. In addition Sierra Nevada Corporation has provide five SIGINT aircraft by the end of the year.

 USAF 318th Special Operations Squadron 1st Special Operations Group

References 

PC-12